Let  be an affine bundle modelled over a vector bundle . In particular, this is an affine connection on the tangent bundle  of a smooth manifold . (That is, the connection on an affine bundle is an example of an affine connection; it is not, however, a general definition of an affine connection. These are related but distinct concepts both unfortunately making use of the adjective "affine".)

 

An affine bundle is a fiber bundle with a general affine structure group  of affine transformations of its typical fiber  of dimension . Therefore, an affine connection is associated to a principal connection. It always exists.
 
For any affine connection , the corresponding linear derivative   of an affine morphism  defines a unique linear connection on a vector bundle .

 

Since every vector bundle is an affine bundle, any linear connection on
a vector bundle also is an affine connection.

If  is a vector bundle, both an affine connection  and an associated linear connection  are
connections on the same vector bundle , and their difference is a basic soldering form on
 

Due to the canonical vertical splitting , this soldering form is brought into a vector-valued form
 

Given an affine connection  on a vector bundle , let  and  be the curvatures of a connection  and the associated linear connection , respectively.  It is readily observed that , where

 

There is the canonical soldering form

on  due to the canonical vertical splitting .

 

See also
Connection (fibred manifold)
Affine connection
Connection (vector bundle)
Connection (mathematics)
Affine gauge theory

References
 
 

Differential geometry
Connection (mathematics)